Chigozie Emmanuel Mbah (born 18 September 1997) is a Nigerian professional footballer who currently plays as a winger for Krabi.

Club career

MŠK Žilina
He came to MŠK Žilina from lower English league in Winter 2016. Mbah made his Fortuna Liga debut for Žilina against Skalica on 26 February 2016.

Slavia Sofia
In July 2017, Mbah signed with Bulgarian club Slavia Sofia.

Alsancak Yeşilova
On 16 August 2019 it was confirmed, that Mbah had joined Cypriot club Merit Alsancak Yeşilova Spor Kulübü.

Honours

Club
Uthai Thani
Thai League 3 (1): 2021–22
Thai League 3 Northern Region (1): 2021–22

References

External links
 
 Fortuna Liga profile
 Futbalnet profile

1997 births
Living people
Nigerian footballers
Association football forwards
MŠK Žilina players
PFC Slavia Sofia players
Slovak Super Liga players
2. Liga (Slovakia) players
First Professional Football League (Bulgaria) players
Nigerian expatriate footballers
Expatriate footballers in England
Nigerian expatriate sportspeople in England
Expatriate footballers in Slovakia
Nigerian expatriate sportspeople in Slovakia
Expatriate footballers in Bulgaria
Nigerian expatriate sportspeople in Bulgaria
Expatriate footballers in Cyprus
Nigerian expatriate sportspeople in Cyprus
Place of birth missing (living people)